Vertebral venous plexuses may refer to:
 External vertebral venous plexuses
 Internal vertebral venous plexuses